Physocephalus is a genus of nematodes belonging to the family Spirocercidae.

The genus has cosmopolitan distribution.

Species:

Physocephalus meridionalis
Physocephalus nitidulans
Physocephalus sexalatus

References

Nematodes